Larissa Meek is a former beauty queen who has competed in the Miss Teen USA and Miss USA pageants and a reality television personality who starred in Average Joe: Hawaii.

Pageants
In 1996 Meek won the Miss Missouri Teen USA 1997 title and competed in the Miss Teen USA 1997 pageant held at South Padre Island, Texas. She did not place but did earn an Honorable Mention (for placing between 11th and 15th place).

In 2000 she competed in the Miss Missouri USA pageant for the first time and won the title. Meek represented Missouri at the Miss USA 2001 pageant telecast live from Gary, Indiana in March 2001, and made the semifinals.  Meek won both the swimsuit and evening gown competitions with scores of 9.45 and 9.39 respectively and advanced to the top five but failed to make the top three after finishing last in the interview competition.  She placed fourth runner-up to Texas' Kandace Krueger.

Reality television
In 2003 she appeared as the star of the reality television show Average Joe: Hawaii, succeeding fellow Miss Missouri Teen USA and Miss Missouri USA titleholder Melana Scantlin for this role. When the show started she went on dates with "average Joes". Partway through the show, however, a bunch of "hunks" were brought in to compete against the Joes, a twist also used on the first edition of the show. When down to the final two men, Meek chose Gil Hyatt over "average Joe" Brian Worth, only to have Hyatt "reject" her after finding out that she previously had dated male supermodel Fabio.

References

External links
Miss Missouri USA & Miss Missouri Teen USA official website
Blog of Larissa Meek

1978 births
Living people
1997 beauty pageant contestants
20th-century Miss Teen USA delegates
Miss USA 2001 delegates
Participants in American reality television series
20th-century American people